Central Industrial Region may refer to:

 Central Industrial Region (Poland)
 Central Industrial Oblast, Russia